Hippoboscinae is a subfamily of the fly family Hippoboscidae. All are parasitic, and unlike some other members of the Hippoboscidae, all Hippoboscinae are winged species.

Systematics
Genus Hippobosca Linnaeus, 1758
H. camelina Leach, 1817
H. equina Linnaeus, 1758
H. fulva Austen, 1912
H. hirsuta Austen, 1911
H. longipennis Fabricius, 1805
H. rufipes von Olfers, 1816
H. variegata Megerle, 1803
Genus Struthibosca Maa, 1963
S. struthionis (Janson, 1889)

References 

Parasitic flies
Hippoboscidae
Brachycera subfamilies